Veľké Turovce is a village and municipality in the Levice District in the Nitra Region of Slovakia.

History
In historical records the village was first mentioned in 1156.

Geography
The village lies at an altitude of 138 metres and covers an area of 9.191 km². It has a population of about 808 people.

Ethnicity
The village is about 61% Magyar and 39% Slovak.

Facilities
The village has a public library and football pitch.

External links
 Official website
https://web.archive.org/web/20070513023228/http://www.statistics.sk/mosmis/eng/run.html

Villages and municipalities in Levice District